Mir Hussein bin A'lam Husseini Heravi  (1245, Ghor - December 19, 1318, Herat) was a Persian poet, author and Sufi.

Works 
 Zad al-Musafirin
 Kanz al-Rumuz
 Sy-Nameh
 Diwan 
 Tarib al-Majalis
 Nuzhat al'Arwah
 Sirat al-Mustaqim
 ruh al'Arwah

References

1245 births
1318 deaths
People from Herat
14th-century Persian-language poets
Afghan Sufis
Afghan Arabs